The Water Tower is located in Rock Island State Park on Rock Island in  the town of Washington, Wisconsin.

History
The water tower was once the property of Icelandic inventor Chester Thordarson. It is located in what is now known as the Thordarson Estate Historic District.

References

Water towers on the National Register of Historic Places in Wisconsin
National Register of Historic Places in Door County, Wisconsin
Limestone buildings in the United States
Towers completed in 1929